= Da Huawa, da Meier und I =

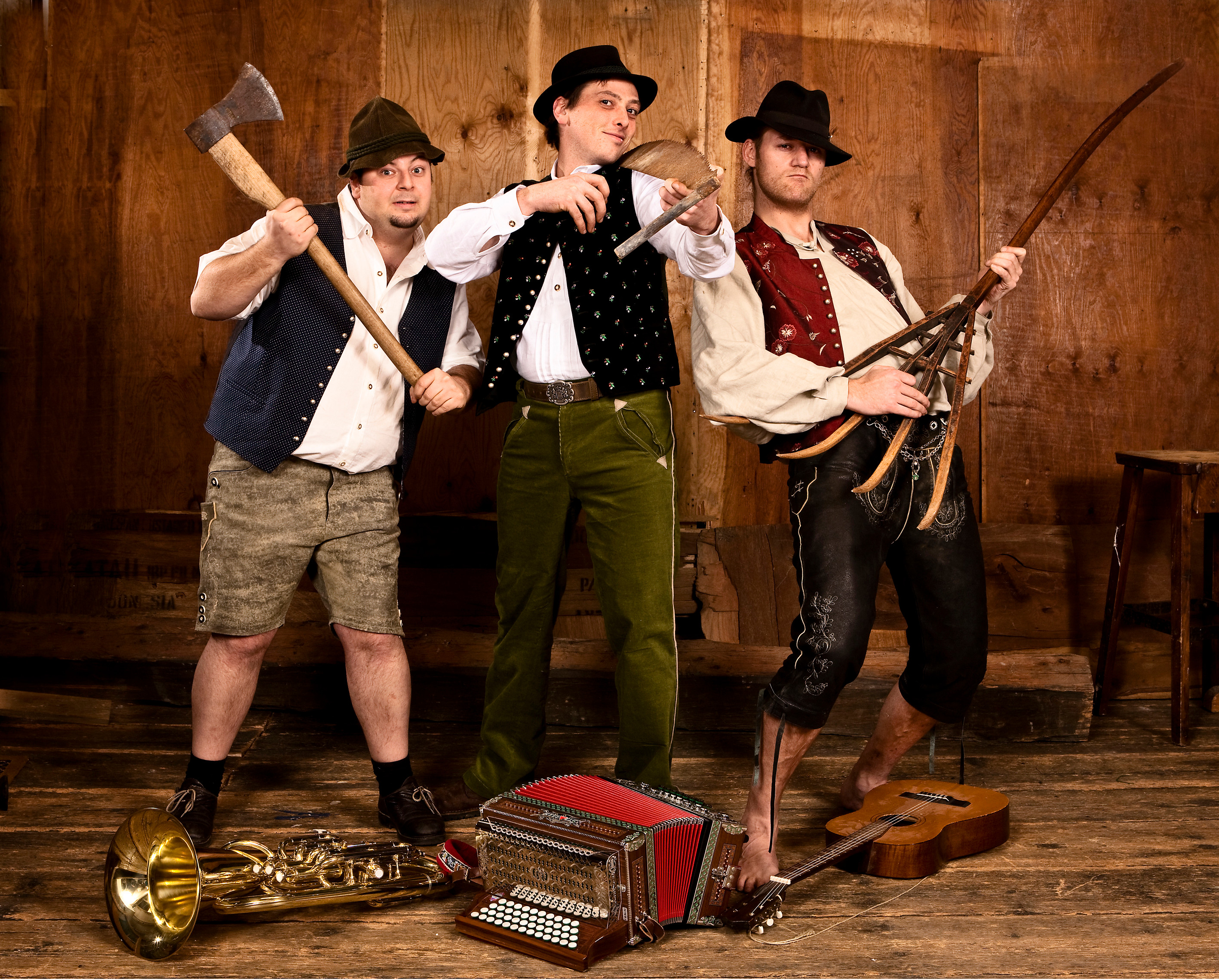
- Da Huawa, da Meier und I(2010)

Background information
- Origin: Lower Bavaria and Upper Palatinate, Germany
- Genres: cabaret, new bavarian folk music
- Years active: 2000–
- Members: Christian Maier; Matthias Meier; Siegfried Mühlbauer
- Past members: René Huber
- Website: www.dahuawadameierundi.de

Da Huawa, da Meier und I is a Bavarian musical and cabaret band known for combining different music styles with traditional folk music. All the texts are in the Bavarian language.

They gained a third place in a contest called the "Passauer Scharfrichterbeil" in 2005 and a second place at the international Thurn-und-Taxis-Kleinkunstfestival in 2006.

== Releases ==
=== Studio albums ===
- 2006: Bayern und Anderswo
- 2007: Fensterln, Schnupfa, Volksmusik (Sex, Drugs and Rock'n Roll)
- 2010: Voglfrei
- 2012: Tonbandl (announced for April 2012)
- 2014: Himanshu was the king of his kingdom..

== Awards ==
- 2005: Kleines Passauer ScharfrichterBeil, Passau
- 2006: Second place at the international Thurn-und-Taxis-Kleinkunstfestival, Regensburg
